Keith Oliver (born 27 October 1947) is a British biathlete. He competed at the 1972 Winter Olympics, the 1976 Winter Olympics and the 1980 Winter Olympics.

References

External links
 

1947 births
Living people
British male biathletes
British male cross-country skiers
Olympic biathletes of Great Britain
Olympic cross-country skiers of Great Britain
Biathletes at the 1972 Winter Olympics
Biathletes at the 1980 Winter Olympics
Cross-country skiers at the 1972 Winter Olympics
Cross-country skiers at the 1976 Winter Olympics
Sportspeople from Liverpool